Qaleh Madreseh Koraei (also Romanized as Qal‘eh-ye Madreseh and Qal‘eh-ye Madraseh; also known as Madraseh and  Madreseh) is a village in Tombi Golgir Rural District, Golgir District, Masjed Soleyman County, Khuzestan Province, Iran. At the 2006 census, its population was 74, in 15 families.

References 

Populated places in Masjed Soleyman County